Club Deportivo Moaña is a Spanish football club based in the municipality of Moaña, Galicia.  It currently plays in Primeira Autonómica – Group 5.

Season to season

Football pitches
 A Xunqueira (1977–2009)
 O Casal (2009-)

Notable former players
 Jonathan Aspas
 Iago Aspas
 Aitor Aspas
 Cristóbal juncal
 Javi Nogueira
 Fran Palmás
 David Chapela

External links
Official website
Futbolme.com profile
senafutbolmarin.blogspot.com.es profile

Football clubs in Galicia (Spain)
Divisiones Regionales de Fútbol clubs
Association football clubs established in 1977
1977 establishments in Spain